The State Cultural Centre of Turkmenistan is a multipurpose performance facility in the Ashgabat, Turkmenistan. Located at Archabil avenue, it was founded by the first President of Turkmenistan Saparmurat Niyazov. It is a place for a wide variety of cultural performances. It was opened in 2007. In the past, bore the name of Saparmurat Turkmenbashi the Great.

Performance and other facilities 

State Cultural Centre of Turkmenistan performs educational, museum education and leisure and entertainment functions, conducts activities officially, state and international levels, a variety of political and cultural promotions, international conferences and exhibitions.

In April 2013, the President of Turkmenistan signed a resolution changing the name under the Ministry of Culture of Turkmenistan National Cultural Center of the Great Saparmurat Turkmenbashi, renaming it to the State Cultural Centre of Turkmenistan.

Structure 
In the structure of the SCCT:
National Library of Turkmenistan
The State Museum of the State Cultural Center of Turkmenistan
Department of the Museum of the first President of Turkmenistan
Mukam Palace

References

Ashgabat
Buildings and structures in Ashgabat
Concert halls in Turkmenistan
Cultural centers
Convention centers in Turkmenistan
Event venues established in 2007